A general election was held in Montana on November 6, 2018. Montana's Class 1 United States Senate seat and its  seat in the United States House of Representatives were up for elections, along with all of the seats in the Montana House of Representatives and half of the seats in the Montana Senate. Various local offices and ballot measures were also up for election. The primary election was held on June 5, 2018.

Federal

Congress

House of Representatives

Incumbent Democrat Jon Tester won re-election.

House of Representatives

Incumbent Republican Greg Gianforte won re-election.

State

Legislature

Senate

25 of the 50 seats in the Montana Senate were up for election in 2018.

House of Representatives

All 100 seats in the Montana House of Representatives were up for election in 2018.

Judicial

Clerk of the Supreme Court

Incumbent Democrat Ed Smith did not run for re-election. Republican Bowen Greenwood defeated Democrat Rex Rank.

Ballot measures

Referendum 128

Referendum 129

Initiative 185

Initiative 186

References

External links

 
Montana